The Green Hornet is a 1940 black-and-white 13-chapter movie serial from Universal Pictures, produced by Henry MacRae, directed by Ford Beebe and Ray Taylor, starring Gordon Jones, Wade Boteler, Keye Luke, and Anne Nagel. The serial is based on The Green Hornet radio series by George W. Trendle and Fran Striker.

Synopsis
Britt Reid, the new publisher of The Sentinel newspaper, secretly becomes the vigilante crime fighter The Green Hornet. Backing him up is his Korean valet and inventor Kato. Together, they investigate and expose several separate underworld rackets. During the course of 15 serial chapters, these high-profile events lead the Hornet and Kato into continued conflict with the henchmen of "The Chief", the hidden mastermind behind a 12-person criminal syndicate controlling those rackets.

Cast
 Gordon Jones as Britt Reid and The Green Hornet
 Al Hodge as the (uncredited) voice of the Green Hornet
 Wade Boteler as Michael Axford
 Keye Luke as Kato. Kato is Korean in the serial rather than being the original Japanese character of the radio series, due to rising anti-Japanese sentiment around the world. This was two years prior to Japan's December 7, 1941 attack on Pearl Harbor and the United States' entry into World War II. The radio show dropped Kato's nationality from the introductory sequence, included passing references in dialogue to his character being Filipino, and years later, after the war, returned to the standard show introduction.
 Anne Nagel as Leonore Case
 Phillip Trent as Jasper Jenks
 Cy Kendall as Curtis Monroe aka 'The Chief'
 Stanley Andrews as Police Commissioner [Chs.1,5,8,9,13]
 Selmer Jackson as District Attorney [Chs.4,10]
 Joseph Crehan as Judge Stanton [Chs.1,9,10,13]
 Walter McGrail as Dean
 Gene Rizzi as Corey
 John Kelly as Pete Hawks 
 Eddie Dunn as D.H. Sligby [Ch.7]
 Edward Earle as Felix Grant [Ch.1]
 Ben Taggart as Phil Bartlett [Chs.3-4]
 Clyde Dilson as Meadows [Ch.5]
 Jerry Marlowe as Bob Stafford [Chs.7,11]
 Frederick Vogeding as Max Gregory [Ch.11] (as Fredrik Vogeding)
 Raymond Bailey as Mr. West

Chapter titles
Source:
 The Tunnel of Terror
 The Thundering Terror
 Flying Coffins
 Pillar of Flame
 The Time Bomb
 Highways of Peril
 Bridge of Disaster
 Dead or alive
 The Hornet Trapped
 Bullets and Ballots
 Disaster Rides the Rails
 Panic in the Zoo
 Doom of the Underworld

Alternative versions
In 1990, under the same title, GoodTimes Home Video released a feature-length  version of the serial on VHS tape, re-edited from the footage in the last six chapters.

Under the title The Green Hornet: Movie Edition, VCI Entertainment released its version of the serial on DVD, January 11, 2011, which includes the first and last chapter and selected other chapters.

Influence
The 1960s Batman television series was created because of the popularity of a re-release of Columbia's Batman serial.  The success of both led to the production of a Green Hornet TV series, which was played as a straight action crime series, "in the tradition of its former presentations", rather than the campy Batman series. It was cancelled after only one season.

References

External links
 
 
 
 
 

1940 films
American black-and-white films
1940s English-language films
Films based on radio series
Universal Pictures film serials
Films directed by Ford Beebe
Films directed by Ray Taylor
The Green Hornet films
American action films
1940s action films
Films with screenplays by George H. Plympton
1940s American films